James Edward O'Doherty (1848 – 2 January 1932) was an Irish lawyer and politician.

Born in Derry and educated at Castleknock and Maynooth, he won first place in all his Law Society examinations and became a solicitor in 1870.

In the general election of 1885, he was elected Member of Parliament for North Donegal. He remained as member for the constituency until he resigned in 1890. In March 1890, he won an award for libel against the Derry Journal.

Endnotes

External links 

1848 births
1932 deaths
Irish Parliamentary Party MPs
Members of the Parliament of the United Kingdom for County Donegal constituencies (1801–1922)
UK MPs 1885–1886
UK MPs 1886–1892